George Lorin Miller (1830–1920) was an American pioneer physician, editor, politician, and land owner in Omaha, Nebraska.  The founder of the Omaha Herald, which later became part of the Omaha World-Herald, Miller arrived in Omaha in 1854, the year the city was founded. He also promoted Omaha as the route of the First transcontinental railroad and the Trans-Mississippi and International Exposition in Omaha in 1898.

Biography
Born to Omaha pioneer politician Lorin Miller, George L. Miller was a graduate from medical school in New York City in 1852. He practiced in Syracuse, New York, for two years before coming to Omaha where his parents settled in 1854. He started the first medical practice in the city upon his arrival.

Miller was elected to the Nebraska Territorial Legislature in 1854. He served one year in the house and then was elected to three terms in the council, serving as president of the legislature in his second term. In 1855 Miller requested that the Congregationalist Church send a minister to Omaha, leading to the assignment of Reuben Gaylord, the city's foremost Christian missionary in its early years. In 1860 Miller moved to St. Joseph, Missouri, where he submitted articles to local newspapers. During that period Miller decided to leave medicine to pursue other ventures. Miller helped recruit the First Nebraska Regiment prior to the Civil War and served as sutler at Fort Kearny until 1864. That year he returned to Omaha and ran for territorial delegate to Congress and was defeated. The following year he started the Democratic Omaha Daily Herald. Miller was attacked by Republican Edward Rosewater of the Omaha Bee on September 6, 1876, as a "jack-of-all trades and a master of none. . . . a medicine man, a hotel builder, an army sutler, a cotton speculator, a railroad jobber, an eating-house keeper, journalist, and a politician. . . [and] a dishonest, unscrupulous, and unprincipled money-grabber." He was the editor of the Omaha Daily Herald for almost twenty-three years before selling the paper in 1887.

In the 1870s he helped Omaha land placement along the First transcontinental railroad and the Union Pacific Missouri River Bridge. Miller was a Nebraska delegate to 1876 Democratic National Convention. The New York Times labeled  Miller "the original Tilden man of the West" for his support of Samuel J. Tilden's presidential campaign that year. In 1879 he gave a tribute to Reverend Gaylord at his funeral. During this period Miller bought a large amount of land in North Omaha, eventually offering a large chunk of his own land for usage as the site of the Trans-Mississippi and International Exposition in Omaha in 1898. Miller served as president of the Expo after his site lost to Kountze Park.

In the late 1880s Dr. Miller built a mansion at what is now 75th and Oakwood Streets in Ralston, a West Omaha suburb. In 1898 the home was destroyed by a fire. Miller helped the new St. Martin of Tours Episcopal Church acquire the limestone used in the mansion, and that building still stands. On September 17, 1900, Miller was placed "under restraint" at the upscale Paxton Hotel in Downtown Omaha. Reports designated him a "raving maniac" and attributed his behavior to paresis.

Miller was president of the Nebraska State Historical Society from 1907 to 1909, and was also the first president of the Board of Park Commissioners in Omaha. In 1907 he did not support fellow Nebraskan Democrat William Jennings Bryan's politics during his candidacy for president, stating that Bryan was "is not a Democrat" and challenging his politics as "radical."

J. Sterling Morton, the other prominent member of the Democratic Party in Nebraska, was a bitter enemy of Miller's during this period. Yet Morton recognized Miller's ability and said of him, "No other man, either by the power of money, or by the power of brawn, or by the strength of brain, did as much to make Omaha a city."

Miller died in Omaha in 1920.

Legacy
Omaha has several tributes to Miller. Miller Park Elementary School, Miller Park, and the Miller Park neighborhood in North Omaha are all named in his honor, as well as the new George Miller Parkway in West Omaha.

See also
History of Omaha

References

1830 births
1920 deaths
Businesspeople from New York City
Businesspeople from Omaha, Nebraska
American newspaper editors
Politicians from Omaha, Nebraska
Newspaper people from Omaha, Nebraska
People of Nebraska in the American Civil War
Members of the Nebraska Territorial Legislature
19th-century American politicians
Nebraska Democrats
Newspaper founders
American company founders